The City of Paris is divided into twenty arrondissements municipaux, administrative districts, more simply referred to as arrondissements. These are not to be confused with departmental arrondissements, which subdivide the larger French departments.

The number of the arrondissement is indicated by the last two digits in most Parisian postal codes (75001 up to 75020). In addition to their number, each arrondissement also has a name, often for a local monument. For example, the 5th arrondissement is also called "Panthéon" in reference to the eponymous building. The first four arrondissements have a shared administration, called Paris Centre.

Description 
The twenty arrondissements are arranged in the form of a clockwise spiral (often likened to a snail shell), starting from the middle of the city, with the first on the Right Bank (north bank) of the Seine.

In French, notably on street signs, the number is often given in Roman numerals. For example, the Eiffel Tower belongs to the VIIe arrondissement while Gare de l'Est is in the Xe arrondissement. In daily speech, people use only the ordinal number corresponding to the arrondissement, e.g. "Elle habite dans le sixième", "She lives in the 6th (arrondissement)".

Due to suburbanization, the population of Paris has gradually shifted outward, with only two arrondissements still growing.

Governance

Uniquely among French cities, Paris is both a municipality (commune) and a department (département). Under the PLM Law (Loi PLM) of 1982, which redefined the governance of Paris, Lyon, and Marseille (hence the PLM acronym), there are both a city council called the Council of Paris and 20 arrondissement councils in Paris. The PLM Law also set limits to the prerogatives of the mayor of Paris, who has to deal with the powers granted to the prefect of police on security issues.

The 20 arrondissement councils (conseils d'arrondissement) are similar in operation to a municipal council (conseil municipal) but with very few powers. Its members are elected at municipal elections in the same way as in municipalities with more than 3,500 inhabitants. Each arrondissement council is made up of 2/3 members elected specifically as arrondissement councillors, while Council of Paris members representing the arrondissement also sit ex officio on their local arrondissement council. For example, the council of the 19th arrondissement has 42 members, of which 28 are conseillers d'arrondissement who only sit on the arrondissement council, while 14 are conseillers de Paris who also sit on the city council. At its first meeting after the elections, each arrondissement council elects its mayor.

Each arrondissement is subdivided administratively into four quartiers. Paris thus has 80 quartiers administratifs, each containing a police station. For a table giving the names of the eighty quartiers, see Quarters of Paris.

Arrondissements 

Notes:
1. With the Bois de Vincennes
2. Without the Bois de Vincennes
3. With the Bois de Boulogne
4. Without the Bois de Boulogne
5. 2005 is the year of the most recent official estimate; population of these arrondissements may still be growing

History

On 11 October 1795, Paris was divided into twelve arrondissements. They were numbered from west to east, with the numbers 1–9 situated on the Right Bank of the Seine and the numbers 10–12 on the Left Bank. Each arrondissement was subdivided into four quartiers, which corresponded to the 48 original districts created in 1790.

Emperor Napoleon III and the Prefect of the Seine Baron Haussmann developed a plan to incorporate several of the surrounding communes into the Paris jurisdiction in the late 1850s. Parliament passed the necessary legislation in 1859, and the expansion took effect when the law was promulgated on 3 November 1859 (though city taxes were not extended to the new neighborhoods until 1 July 1860). The previous twelve arrondissements were done away with, and twenty new arrondissements were created. In historical records, when it is necessary to distinguish between the two systems, the original arrondissements are indicated by adding the term ancienne ("former" or "old"), for example, 2ème ancienne or 7ème anc.

Before the reorganization, non-married couples who lived together were said to have "married at the town hall of the 13th arrondissement" ("se marier à la mairie du 13e arrondissement"), as a jocular reference to there being no 13th. When Haussmann released his plan for the new boundaries and numbering system, residents of Passy objected because it placed them in the new 13th arrondissement. The mayor of Passy, Jean-Frédéric Possoz, devised the idea of a numbering the arrondissements in a spiral pattern beginning on the Right Bank, which put Passy in the 16th. This system turned the Louvre area, which contained the Tuileries Palace and other imperial palaces, into the 1st. The Gobelins area would become the 13th instead.

In early 2016, mayor Anne Hidalgo proposed that the first four arrondissements should have their administrations merged, and the Council of Paris approved this on 15 February. The four have a combined population of about 100,000, with the 1st, 2nd, 4th, and 3rd arrondissements in that order being the four smallest in Paris. The matter was taken up in the National Assembly in August 2016, and approved in February 2017. In a postal referendum from 8 to 14 October 2018, the town hall of the 3rd arrondissement was chosen to house the new shared administration, and the name "Paris Centre" was chosen for the sector. The reform was implemented on 29 June 2020, the day after the second round of the 2020 Paris municipal election, with the four arrondissements now sharing a mayor and a district council. The four arrondissements continue to exist, but are no longer used as administrative and electoral sectors.

See also
 Arrondissement, for other uses of the term.
 Historical quarters of Paris
 Paris, je t'aime, film composed of five-minute sequences on each arrondissement
 Administration of Paris

References

Bibliography

External links
 Official Paris website
 Website showing location, numbering conventions, and general info for arrondissements

 
Administration